North Richmond railway station is located on the Mernda and Hurstbridge lines in Victoria, Australia. It serves the inner eastern Melbourne suburb of Richmond, and opened on 21 October 1901.

History

North Richmond station opened on 21 October 1901, when a direct line was provided between Princes Bridge and Collingwood.

In 1913, a crossover was provided at the Down end of the station. In 1941, it was abolished.

In 1981, the current station buildings were provided.

Platforms and services

North Richmond is an elevated station with two side platforms, each with a pebbledash station building. It is served by Mernda and Hurstbridge line trains.

Platform 1:
  all stations services to Flinders Street
  all stations services to Flinders Street

Platform 2:
  all stations services to Mernda
  all stations and limited express services to Macleod, Greensborough, Eltham and Hurstbridge

Transport links

Kinetic Melbourne operates twelve routes via North Richmond station, under contract to Public Transport Victoria:
 : Elsternwick station – Clifton Hill
 : Melbourne CBD (Lonsdale Street) – Box Hill station
 : Melbourne CBD (Queen Street) – Ringwood North
 : Melbourne CBD (Lonsdale Street) – Westfield Doncaster
 : Melbourne CBD (Lonsdale Street) – The Pines Shopping Centre (peak-hour only)
 : Melbourne CBD (Queen Street) – Donvale
 : Melbourne CBD (Lonsdale Street) – Deep Creek Reserve (Doncaster East)
 : Melbourne CBD (Queen Street) – La Trobe University Bundoora Campus
  : Melbourne CBD (Lonsdale Street) – The Pines Shopping Centre
  : Melbourne CBD (Lonsdale Street) – Warrandyte
  : Melbourne CBD (Lonsdale Street) – Mitcham station
  : Melbourne CBD (Lonsdale Street) – The Pines Shopping Centre (peak-hour only)

McKenzie's Tourist Services operates one route via North Richmond station, under contract to Public Transport Victoria:
 : Eildon – Southern Cross station

Yarra Trams operates two tram routes via North Richmond station:
 : Victoria Gardens – St Kilda
 : Box Hill – Port Melbourne

References

External links
 Melway map at street-directory.com.au

Railway stations in Australia opened in 1901
Railway stations in Melbourne
Railway stations in the City of Yarra